Ascot Partners is a hedge fund that was a feeder fund to Bernie Madoff.

It is headed by money manager and financier J. Ezra Merkin as general partner.  It was managed by Gabriel Capital Corporation, of which Merkin was chairman.  Among its investors were Yeshiva University and New York University.

The hedge fund lost $1.8 billion in the Bernie Madoff Ponzi scheme.

See also
List of investors in Bernard L. Madoff Securities

References

Madoff investment scandal